Manteca is a city in San Joaquin County, California. The city had a population of 83,498 as of the 2020 Census.

History 
It was founded in 1861 by Joshua Cowell. In 1873, the Central Pacific Railroad laid track directly through the area. The residents wanted to refer to their new train station as "Cowell Station", but there was already a Cowell Station near Tracy. The residents agreed to change the name of the community, choosing "Monteca" as the new name. This was misprinted as "Manteca" (Spanish for lard) by the railroad, and the misspelled version was eventually accepted as the name of the town. In 1918, Manteca was incorporated as a city, and Joshua Cowell became its first mayor.

In 1935, photojournalist Dorothea Lange took photos of William & Mary Dimotakis (immigrants from the Greek island of Crete), and their youngest child, son George, on the family farm in Manteca for the Farm Security Administration. The farm, near the industrial park area, is still owned by the Dimotakis family. The images can be found in the Library of Congress. 

Manteca fashions itself the "Family City", and it lies at a crossroads of major highways and railroads. As recently as the 1970s, Manteca existed primarily on agriculture and was still barely a stop between two freeways, Interstate 5 and State Route 99. The continuing rise in Bay Area housing prices caused Bay Area families to look further eastward for more affordable places to live. Since the construction of the 120 bypass portion of State Route 120, Manteca has become a popular choice for these commuters. The 1990s saw an increase in the city's population and the construction of its third high school (Sierra High School), joining Manteca High School and East Union High School. The population of Manteca continues to increase, with some housing being constructed on what was once farmland to the north and southeast. Manteca has more than tripled in population since 1980.

Manteca is the home base for the "Not Forgotten Memorial Day Event", the largest commemoration for veterans on the West Coast. The event is held annually on the Sunday before Memorial Day. The event draws over 20,000 attendees.

Geography

Neighboring towns include Lathrop, Ripon, Escalon, and Tracy. Manteca is located in between the larger cities of Modesto and Stockton.

Climate
According to the Köppen Climate Classification system, Manteca has a hot-summer mediterranean climate, abbreviated "Csa" on climate maps.  It is very hot and dry in summer, and mild in winter, except during spells of seasonal tule fog, when it can be quite chilly for many days. Summers are exceptionally dry, whereas winters are rainy with stretches of fair weather.

Demographics

The 2010 United States Census reported that Manteca had a population of 67,096. The racial makeup of Manteca was 49.6% White, 9.8% African American, 1.1% Native American, 12.1% Asian,0.6% Pacific Islander, 11.4% from other races, and 7.2% from two or more races. Hispanic or Latino of any race were 43.7%.

The Census reported that 66,601 people (99.3% of the population) lived in households, 150 (0.2%) lived in non-institutionalized group quarters, and 345 (0.5%) were institutionalized.

There were 21,618 households, of which 9,681 (44.8%) had children under the age of 18 living in them, 11,973 (55.4%) were opposite-sex married couples living together, 3,009 (13.9%) had a female householder with no husband present, 1,590 (7.4%) had a male householder with no wife present. There were 1,629 (7.5%) unmarried opposite-sex partnerships and 130 (0.6%) same-sex married couples or partnerships. 3,902 households (18.0%) were made up of individuals, and 1,542 (7.1%) had someone living alone who was 65 years of age or older. The average household size was 3.08. There were 16,572 families (76.7% of all households); the average family size was 3.48.

19,432 people (29.0% of the population) were under the age of 18, 6,569 people (9.8%) aged 18 to 24, 18,075 people (26.9%) aged 25 to 44, 16,367 people (24.4%) aged 45 to 64, and 6,653 people (9.9%) who were 65 years of age or older. The median age was 33.6 years. For every 100 females, there were 96.8 males. For every 100 females age 18 and over, there were 93.6 males.

The homeowner vacancy rate was 2.7%; the rental vacancy rate was 6.5%.  41,225 people (61.4% of the population) lived in owner-occupied housing units and 25,376 people (37.8%) lived in rental housing units.

Economy

Top employers
According to the city's 2011 Comprehensive Annual Financial Report, the top employers in the city were:

Transit
Manteca Transit Center is the hub of public transit in the city. Local bus service is provided by Manteca Transit.

A commuter rail service is provided by the Altamont Corridor Express (ACE) at the Lathrop/Manteca station – it operates in peak travel directions with trips to San Jose in the morning and to Stockton in the evening. It is expected to be routed directly to the Transit Center by 2023.

Education
Public schools in Manteca are part of the Manteca Unified School District. The school district encompasses the towns of Manteca, Lathrop, the community of French Camp, and the Weston Ranch community in Stockton.  There are no middle schools; elementary school continues through the 8th grade, with a mix of both year-round and traditional schools. Manteca Unified School District has 19 elementary schools, 5 high schools, and 2 continuation schools. Not all of the schools listed below are in Manteca itself.

High schools

 Calla High School
 East Union High School
 Manteca High School
 Sierra High School
 Weston Ranch High School
 New Vision High School (continuation)
 Lathrop High School
 Be.Tech High School and Career Academy

Elementary schools

 August Knodt
 Brock Elliott
 French Camp
 George Komure
 George McParland
 Golden West
 Great Valley (Salida)
 Joseph Widmer Jr.
 Joshua Cowell
 Lathrop
 Lincoln
 Mossdale Elementary
 Neil Hafley
 New Haven
 Nile Garden
 Sequoia
 Shasta
 Stella Brockman
 Veritas
 Walter E. Woodward
 Alta Vista (private)
 St. Anthony's (private)

Adult schools
 Lindbergh Educational Center

Notable people

 Gilbert Luján (b. 1940 – d. 2011) – sculptor, painter
Joshua Patton (b. 1997) - basketball player in the Israeli Basketball Premier League
 Justin Roiland (b. 1980) – animator, director, producer and voice-actor
 Kiwi Gardner (b. 1993) – current NBA G League basketball player; attended Manteca High School
 Scott Brooks (b. 1965) – former NBA basketball player and current head coach; attended East Union High School
 Kenny Wooten (b. 1998) – current NBA basketball player; attended Manteca High School
 Sammy L. Davis (b. 1946) – Medal of Honor recipient
 Marliece Andrada (b. 1972) – actress and Playboy's Playmate of the Month in March 1998
 Ernie Barber (b. 1914 – d. 1989) – former NFL player for the Washington Redskins
 Ted Nuce (b. 1961) – former World Champion bull rider, Pro Rodeo Hall of Fame; attended Manteca High School
 April Bowlby (b. 1980) – actress
 Paul Wiggin (b. 1934) – former American football player and coach; attended Manteca High School
 Milo Candini (b. 1917 – d. 1998) – Major League Baseball player 1943–51
 Scott Speed (b. 1983) – race car driver
 Dev (b. 1989) – singer songwriter
 Doug Mikolas (b. 1961) – football player
 Karen Jankowski — rally driver
 Congressman John J. McFall (b. 1918 - d. 2006) Served in the United States House of Representatives 1957–79. Majority Whip and Appropriations Transportation Subcommittee Chairman. Mayor of Manteca and Member of California State Assembly. Son of Hope McFall who was killed in action in World War I.

References

External links
 
 
 
 Manteca Convention and Visitors Bureau
 Manteca Chamber of Commerce

 
1918 establishments in California
Cities in San Joaquin County, California
Incorporated cities and towns in California
Populated places established in 1918